The fifth and final season of the American television series Gotham, based on characters from DC Comics related to the Batman franchise, revolves around the characters of James "Jim" Gordon and Bruce Wayne. The season is produced by Primrose Hill Productions, DC Entertainment, and Warner Bros. Television, with John Stephens serving as the showrunner. The season was inspired and adapted elements from the comic book storylines of Batman: No Man's Land and Batman: Zero Year. The subtitle for the season is Legend of the Dark Knight.

The season was ordered in May 2018. Production began that July and ended that December. Ben McKenzie stars as Gordon, alongside returning principal cast members Donal Logue, David Mazouz, Morena Baccarin, Sean Pertwee, Robin Lord Taylor, Erin Richards, Camren Bicondova, Cory Michael Smith, Jessica Lucas and Chris Chalk. The fifth season premiered on January 3, 2019 on Fox and concluded on April 25, 2019, consisting of 12 episodes. A prequel series, Pennyworth, developed by a returning Bruno Heller and Danny Cannon, and starring Jack Bannon as a younger version of the iteration of Alfred Pennyworth portrayed by Pertwee in Gotham, began airing its 10-episode first season on Epix in July 2019.

Cast and characters

Main 
 Ben McKenzie as James "Jim" Gordon
 Donal Logue as Harvey Bullock
 David Mazouz as Bruce Wayne
 Morena Baccarin as Leslie "Lee" Thompkins
 Sean Pertwee as Alfred Pennyworth
 Robin Lord Taylor as Oswald Cobblepot / Penguin
 Erin Richards as Barbara Kean
 Camren Bicondova as Selina Kyle
 Cory Michael Smith as Edward Nygma / Riddler
 Jessica Lucas as Tabitha Galavan
 Chris Chalk as Lucius Fox

Recurring 
Kelcy Griffin as Vanessa Harper
Hunter Jones as Will Thomas
Jaime Murray as Nyssa al Ghul
Francesca Root-Dodson as Ecco
J. W. Cortes as Alvarez
Cameron Monaghan as Jeremiah Valeska
Shane West as Eduardo Dorrance / Bane

Guest 
David W. Thompson as Jonathan Crane / Scarecrow
Andrew Sellon as Arthur Penn / Ventriloquist
Peyton List as Ivy "Pamela" Pepper / Poison Ivy
Alex Morf as Sykes
David Kallaway as Tank
Will Meyers as Gabriel
Anthony Carrigan as Victor Zsasz
BD Wong as Hugo Strange
Shiva Kalaiselvan as Lelia
Marceline Hugot as Gretel
David Carranza as Angel Vallelunga
Sarah Schenkkan as Magpie
Benedict Samuel as Jervis Tetch / Mad Hatter
Sarah Pidgeon as Jane Cartwright / Jane Doe
Dan Hedaya as Dix
Julian Gamble as Judge
John Bedford Lloyd as General Wade
Ann Harada as Mayor
Richard Kind as Aubrey James
Jeté Laurence as Barbara Lee Gordon
Lili Simmons as adult Selina Kyle

Episodes

Production

Development 
On May 13, 2018, Fox renewed Gotham for a fifth and final season. While the season was initially given a 10-episode order, this was later increased to 12, thereby making the season finale the series' 100th episode. John Stephens serves as the season's showrunner.

Writing 
The fifth season is shorter than the previous seasons, all of which had 22 episodes each. As a result of this, Stephens said, "We move really quickly [...] We tried to build out the character moments as well. Sometimes we've had so much plot that we had to squeeze out some of the character stuff and now that it's the last chance we have to be with these characters, we're letting them live in these moments." The season is inspired by, and adapts elements from two comic book storylines: Batman: No Man's Land, in which the beleaguered Gotham City is cut off from the rest of the world; and Batman: Zero Year, which focuses on Bruce Wayne / Batman's initial period as a costumed vigilante, and his efforts to stop Edward Nygma / Riddler from taking over Gotham. The No Man's Land arc was planned three years in advance, and the producers intended for it to be an "inspiration", rather than a "religious" adaptation of the comic book storyline. The season features ellipsis and analepsis, and therefore three time periods: the season premiere opens 391 days after the events of the season four finale "No Man's Land", before settling back at 87 days. The final episode jumps 10 years into the future, where Bruce is established as a vigilante.

Casting 
Main cast members Ben McKenzie, Donal Logue, David Mazouz, Morena Baccarin, Sean Pertwee, Robin Lord Taylor, Erin Richards, Camren Bicondova, Cory Michael Smith, Jessica Lucas and Chris Chalk return from previous seasons as James Gordon, Harvey Bullock, Bruce Wayne, Leslie Thompkins, Alfred Pennyworth, Oswald Cobblepot / Penguin, Barbara Kean, Selina Kyle, Edward Nygma / Riddler, Tabitha Galavan, and Lucius Fox. Despite Lucas initially being advertised as a regular for the season, her character was killed off in the season premiere. For the final episode, Lili Simmons replaced Bicondova to portray Selina as an adult.

Benedict Samuel, who played Jervis Tetch / Mad Hatter as a regular in the third season and a guest in the fourth season, returned as a guest in the fifth season. Andrew Sellon, who recurred as Arthur Penn in the fourth season, returned for the fifth season in a guest capacity. He said his character would have become the series' version of the Ventriloquist, but due to the shortened season and pacing reasons, the idea was initially scrapped. After Fox extended the season's episode count from 10 to 12, the creative team were able to continue with their original plan of making Penn the Ventriloquist. Shane West played the recurring role of Gordon's military ally Eduardo Dorrance, written as the series' version of Bane. In October 2018, Jaime Murray was cast in a recurring role as Theresa Walker; it was eventually revealed that her character was actually Nyssa al Ghul.

Design 
John Glaser designed the season's costumes. Stephens compared the Batsuit worn by Bruce Wayne in the season finale to the one seen in the film The Dark Knight Rises (2012) due to being a matte, metallic short-eared battlesuit. Mazouz provided the close up shots and voice for the character, while stunt double Mikhail Mudrik filled in for distant shots to fit with the character's grown-up appearance. Lord Taylor said the season finale would feature Oswald Cobblepot resembling the character as he in the comics. To achieve Cobblepot's fat look, he wore a fatsuit. At Lord Taylor's request, the costume designer consciously avoided making Cobblepot resemble Violet Beauregarde's "blueberry girl" look from Willy Wonka & the Chocolate Factory (1971) and instead went for a "little more monstrous" look, which included depicting the character with a hunch. Additionally, Edward Nygma's season finale Riddler costume was designed to look exactly as in the comics, by having a green color scheme and being filled with question marks throughout. The final episode sees Selina established as a cat burglar; Bicondova said the costume for this episode eschewed the ears seen in most Catwoman costumes in order to look more grounded.

Filming 
The season began production in July 2018. Before the season began filming, Ben McKenzie began growing a moustache to accurately resemble Gordon as seen in the comics. However, since he had only two days to grow the moustache, it was ultimately decided that he sport a fake one. Erin Richards directed "The Trial of Jim Gordon", which was the season's twelfth and final episode to be produced but ninth to air, making her directorial debut on television. Filming for the season ended in December.

Release 
The season premiered on January 3, 2019 on Fox in the United States, and ended on April 25, 2019. The season was released on DVD and Blu-ray on June 11, 2019.

Reception

Ratings

Critical response 
The review aggregator website Rotten Tomatoes reported an 85% approval rating with an average rating of 7.17/10 based on 20 reviews. The website's critical consensus reads, "Gotham concludes in a glorious free-for-all that takes full advantage of the series' dense roster of colorful villains, making for an extended climax that is equal parts daffy and thrilling."

References 

Gotham (TV series) seasons
2019 American television seasons